Ted Arison ( 24 February 1924 – 1 October 1999) was an Israeli businessman who co-founded Norwegian Cruise Lines in 1966 with Knut Kloster and soon left to form Carnival Cruise Lines in 1972.

Early years
Arison was born Theodore Arisohn on 24 February 1924 in Tel Aviv (in the then British Mandate of Palestine) to Meir, a wealthy businessman, and Vera Arisohn. He was a third-generation sabra of Romanian descent and studied commerce and economics at the American University of Beirut. During World War II, he enlisted in the Jewish Brigade of the British Army and fought in Italy. After the British departure, he served as an officer in the Israel Defense Forces during the 1948 Arab–Israeli War, eventually achieving the rank of lieutenant colonel. From 1946 to 1951, he managed M. Dizengoff & Co., a shipping company.

Career
Frustrated by the lack of business opportunities, Arison wrapped up his business and moved to the United States after 1952. He took his family to New York in 1954 and moved to Miami, Florida, in 1966, where he co-founded Norwegian Cruise Lines in 1966 with Knut Kloster. In 1971 the partnership broke up on bad terms and Arison formed Carnival Cruise Lines in 1972 with the help of Meshulam Riklis, in which he would make his fortune.

In 1981, he established the National Foundation for Advancement in the Arts based in Miami. He brought professional basketball to South Florida with the formation of the Miami Heat in 1988, and established the Arison Foundation, a philanthropic institution, in Israel and the United States.

In 1986, Arison's condominium neighbor, Count de S.G. Elkaim (Vice President at E.F. Hutton & Company, Inc.), advised him to go public before an impending big correction in the stock market. Following his advice and guidance, Carnival Cruise Lines was floated on the American Stock Exchange in July 1987, one month before the stock market top and the infamous crash of October 1987. (Hutton was one of the four underwriters.)

No competition was able to raise money, which gave Carnival an advantage. In February 1989, Arison awarded in the strictest of confidence the exclusive sale of the company at $30 per share to Elkaim. The stock market recovery from the emotional shock on the 1987 crash was not able to absorb this transaction. Consequently, having Carnival in the stock market and the ensuing rally until 1999 catapulted Arison to become one of the world's richest people.

Return to Israel
In an effort to avoid estate tax in the United States, in 1990, Arison renounced his U.S. citizenship and residence and returned to Israel, where he founded Arison Investments. In 1997, Arison Investments headed a consortium that purchased the controlling share in Bank Hapoalim for more than $1 billion, the largest privatization in Israel's history.

Family
Arison married Mina Wasserman (1927-2012), who immigrated to Israel from Romania, in 1948 and they had two children: a son Micky (born 1949) and a daughter Shari (born 1957). The couple divorced after moving to Florida in 1966. In 1967 he married Marilyn "Lin" Hersh and later adopted her son Michael (born 1961).

Death
Arison died in Tel Aviv  on 1 October 1999. Micky Arison was Chief Executive Officer of Carnival Corporation & plc until August 2013 and is currently chairman of the company. Shari Arison is Israel's wealthiest woman, and is the owner of Arison Investments that comprises several business companies, the largest among them Bank Hapoalim, and of several philanthropic organizations that are subsidiaries of The Ted Arison Family Foundation.

At the time of his death, Arison failed by approximately nine months to meet the requirement of being outside of United States territory for 10 years for the tax benefits of his renunciation of U.S. citizenship to be realized.

See also
 Arison family

References

Sources

External links 
The Ted Arison Family Foundation website

1924 births
1999 deaths
British Army personnel of World War II
Carnival Corporation & plc people
Israeli bankers
Israeli billionaires
Israeli colonels
20th-century Israeli Jews
Israeli people of Romanian-Jewish descent
Israeli philanthropists
Jews in Mandatory Palestine
Miami Heat owners
Norwegian Cruise Line
People who renounced United States citizenship
People from Zikhron Ya'akov
People from Tel Aviv
Israeli businesspeople in shipping
American businesspeople in shipping
Jewish Brigade personnel
20th-century philanthropists
Burials at Kiryat Shaul Cemetery